Banila Co. (Hangul: 바닐라코) is a South Korean cosmetics brand owned by F&F.
Banila Co. was created by F&F in 2005. It now has over 80 stores in South Korea and China.

Products

Banila Co. offers a range of cosmetic products including:

 Cleaning Balm
 Skin Starter Pack
 Hydration Boosters
 Peel Clear Pad
 Exfoliating Scrub
 Foam Cleanser
 Skin Primer
 Sheet Mask
 Lip Makeup
 Eye Makeup

Banila Co. also offers different varieties of products that are free of alcohol, artificial coloring, artificial fragrances, essential oil, parabens, and silicone.

Spokespersons and models
In March 2011, actress Min Hyo-rin became the new model of Banila Co.

On August 8, 2011, SISTAR's Hyorin was named the new model of Banila Co.

On September 25, 2012, it was announced that Girls' Generation's Jessica would be the new endorser of Banila Co.

On June 20, 2013, Banila Co. announced that singer Roy Kim will be their first male model.

On August 19, 2014, Song Ji-hyo was named as the new model of Banila Co.

On September 28, 2016, singer Taeyeon (Girls' Generation) was chosen as the new spokesmodel for Banila Co.

On August 21, 2019, Kim Min-kyu was selected as new male model for Banila Co.

On January 26, 2020, actor Song Kang was chosen as the new model for Banila Co.

On February 26, 2020, actress Shin Se-kyung was chosen as the new model for Banila Co.

On October 21, 2021, singer Jeonghan (Seventeen) was chosen as the new ambassador for Banila Co.

See also
 List of South Korean retail companies

References

External links
Official Website

Cosmetics companies of South Korea
Cosmetics brands of South Korea
South Korean brands
Chemical companies established in 2005
Skin care brands